Carl M. Johnson (born September 12, 1933) was an American farmer, businessman, and politician.

Johnson lived in St. Peter, Nicollet County, Minnesota with his wife and family and was a businessman and farmer. Johnson went to Gaylord High School in Gaylord, Minnesota. He served in the United States Army during the Korean War. Johnson received his bachelor's degree in history and industrial arts from Minnesota State University, Mankato. Johnson served in the Minnesota House of Representatives from 1967 to 1982 and was a Democrat.

References

1933 births
Living people
People from St. Peter, Minnesota
Businesspeople from Minnesota
Farmers from Minnesota
Military personnel from Minnesota
Minnesota State University, Mankato alumni
Democratic Party members of the Minnesota House of Representatives